Rajesh John is an Indian bodybuilder and fitness trainer from Kerala who won Mr. World for the differently abled in 2016 and World Fitness Federation Mr. India Competition for the differently abled twice, in 2016 and in 2018.

Personal life
Rajesh was born to Ummarapallil M.D. John and Omana John in Thazhathuvadaku, Kollam district in the Indian State of Kerala. He completed his schooling from Holy Trinity School Thiruvananthapuram and Mar Thoma Dynoysius School Pathanapuram. After attaining higher secondary education from IHRD T.H.S.S. Adoor, he completed a diploma in electronics and computer networking from NSS College, Pathanamthitta. Rajesh works as a fitness trainer and he runs a gym at Enathu in Pathanamthitta district, Kerala.

Career and achievements
Rajesh was the runner-up in the 2009 Mr. Kerala competition. In the subsequent years of 2010, 2011, and 2012, he became the champion in this competition. He has won the Mr. India title (differently abled category) thrice in 2009 (IBBF, Ludhiana), 2011 (IBBF, Nashik), and 2013 IBBF, Khammam). He won the WFF Mr. World title for differently abled 2016 at Ireland, WFF Eurasia Championship 2018 at Kyiv. He also won the WFF India Genetic Classic 2018 championship at Ooty in 2018.

References

Date of birth missing (living people)
Indian bodybuilders
People from Kollam district
Sportspeople from Kerala
Indian disabled sportspeople
Sportsmen with disabilities
Year of birth missing (living people)
Living people